James Watson St. Clair (January 20, 1885 – May 4, 1945) was an American football, basketball, and baseball coach. He served as head football coach at North Texas State Normal College, now the University of North Texas, from 1915 to 1919, compiling a 20–11–2 record.

St. Clair died of a heart attack on May 4, 1945, at this home in Dallas, Texas.

Head coaching record

Football

References

1885 births
1945 deaths
American men's basketball coaches
Basketball coaches from Mississippi
Baylor University alumni
College men's basketball head coaches in the United States
North Texas Mean Green football coaches
North Texas Mean Green men's basketball coaches
People from Houston, Mississippi
SMU Mustangs baseball coaches
SMU Mustangs men's basketball coaches
Southwest Conference commissioners